The Hills, an electoral district of the Legislative Assembly in the Australian state of New South Wales, was created in 1962 and abolished in 2007.


Election results

Elections in the 2000s

2003

Elections in the 1990s

1999

1995

1993 by-election

1991

1990 by-election

Elections in the 1980s

1988

1984

1981

Elections in the 1970s

1978

1976 by-election

1976

1973

1971

Elections in the 1960s

1968

1965

1962

References

New South Wales state electoral results by district